NEXRAD or Nexrad (Next-Generation Radar) is a network of 160 high-resolution S-band Doppler weather radars operated by the National Weather Service (NWS), an agency of the National Oceanic and Atmospheric Administration (NOAA) within the United States Department of Commerce, the Federal Aviation Administration (FAA) within the Department of Transportation, and the U.S. Air Force within the Department of Defense. Its technical name is WSR-88D (Weather Surveillance Radar, 1988, Doppler).

NEXRAD detects precipitation and atmospheric movement or wind. It returns data which when processed can be displayed in a mosaic map which shows patterns of precipitation and its movement. The radar system operates in two basic modes, selectable by the operator – a slow-scanning clear-air mode for analyzing air movements when there is little or no activity in the area, and a precipitation mode, with a faster scan for tracking active weather. NEXRAD has an increased emphasis on automation, including the use of algorithms and automated volume scans.

Deployment

In the 1970s, the U.S. Departments of Commerce, Defense, and Transportation, agreed that to better serve their operational needs, the existing national radar network needed to be replaced. The radar network consisted of WSR-57 developed in 1957, and WSR-74 developed in 1974. Neither system employed Doppler technology, which provides wind speed and direction information.

The Joint Doppler Operational Project (JDOP) was formed in 1976 at the National Severe Storms Laboratory (NSSL) to study the usefulness of using Doppler radar to identify severe and tornadic thunderstorms. Tests over the next three years, conducted by the National Weather Service and the Air Weather Service agency of the U.S. Air Force, found that Doppler radar provided much improved early detection of severe thunderstorms. A working group that included the JDOP published a paper providing the concepts for the development and operation of a national weather radar network. In 1979, the NEXRAD Joint System Program Office (JSPO) was formed to move forward with the development and deployment of the proposed NEXRAD radar network. That year, the NSSL completed a formal report on developing the NEXRAD system.

When the proposal was presented to the Reagan administration, two options were considered to build the radar systems: allow corporate bids to build the systems based on the schematics of the previously developed prototype radar or seek contractors to build their own systems using predetermined specifications. The JSPO group opted to select a contractor to develop and produce the radars that would be used for the national network. Radar systems developed by Raytheon and Unisys were tested during the 1980s. However, it took four years to allow the prospective contractors to develop their proprietary models. Unisys was selected as the contractor, and was awarded a full-scale production contract in January 1990.

Installation of an operational prototype was completed in the fall of 1990 in Norman, Oklahoma. The first installation of a WSR-88D for operational use in daily forecasting was in Sterling, Virginia on June 12, 1992. The last system deployed as part of the installation program was installed in North Webster, Indiana on August 30, 1997. In 2011, the new Langley Hill NEXRAD was added at Langley Hill, Washington to better cover the Pacific Coast of that area; other radars also filled gaps in coverage at Evansville, Indiana and Ft. Smith, Arkansas, following the initial installations. The site locations were strategically chosen to provide overlapping coverage between radars in case one failed during a severe weather event. Where possible, they were co-located with NWS Weather Forecast Offices (WFOs) to permit quicker access by maintenance technicians.

The NEXRAD radars incorporated a number of improvements over the radar systems that were previously in use. The new system provided Doppler velocity, improving tornado prediction ability by detecting rotation present within the storm at different scan angles. It provided improved resolution and sensitivity, enabling operators to see features such as cold fronts, thunderstorm gust fronts, and mesoscale to even storm scale features of thunderstorms that had never been visible on radar. The NEXRAD radars also provided volumetric scans of the atmosphere allowing operators to examine the vertical structure of storms and could act as wind profilers by providing detailed wind information for several kilometers above the radar site. The radars also had a much increased range allowing detection of weather events at much greater distances from the radar site.

WSR-88D development, maintenance, and training are coordinated by the NEXRAD Radar Operations Center (ROC) located at the National Weather Center (NWC) in Norman, Oklahoma.

The University of Louisiana - Monroe operates a "WSR-88D clone" radar that is used by the NWS to fill the coverage gap in northeastern LA, southeastern AR, and western MS. However, the status of the radar being in the NEXRAD network is disputed.

Radar properties
A standard WSR-88D operates in the S band, at a frequency of around 2800 MHz, with a typical gain around 53 dB using a center-fed parabolic antenna. The pulse repetition frequency (PRF) varies from 318 to 1300 Hz with a maximum power output of 700 kW at Klystron output, although dependent on the volume coverage pattern (VCP) selected by the operator. All NEXRADs have a dish diameter of 9.1 m (30 ft) and an aperture diameter of 8.5 m (28 ft). Using the predetermined VCPs, NEXRADs have a traditional elevation minimum and maximum ranging from 0.1 to 19.5 degrees, although the non-operational minimum and maximum spans from −1 to +45 degrees. Unlike its predecessor, the WSR-74, the antenna can not be manually steered by the operator. WSR-88D Level I data is the recorded output of the digital receiver. Spatial resolution varies with data type and scan angle – level III data has a resolution of 1 km x 1 degree in azimuth, while super-res level II, (implemented in 2008 nationwide), has a resolution of 250m by 0.5 degrees in azimuth below 2.4 degrees in elevation.

Scan strategies
The NEXRAD radar system continually refreshes its three-dimensional database via one of several predetermined scan patterns. These patterns have differing PRFs to fit the respective use, but all have a constant resolution. Since the system samples the atmosphere in three dimensions, there are many variables that can be changed, depending on the desired output. With all traditional VCPs, the antenna scans at a maximum of 19.5 degrees in elevation, and a minimum of .5, with some coastal sites scanning as low as .2 or lower. Due to the incomplete elevation coverage, a phenomenon known as "The Cone of Silence" is present with all NEXRAD radars. The term describes the lack of coverage directly above the radar sites.

There are currently seven Volume Coverage Patterns (VCP) available to NWS meteorologists, with an eighth in the process of replacing one of the existing seven. Each VCP is a predefined set of instructions that control antenna rotation speed, elevation angle, transmitter pulse repetition frequency and pulse width. The radar operator chooses from the VCPs based on the type of weather occurring:

 Clear Air or Light Precipitation: VCP 31, 32, and 35
 Shallow Precipitation: VCP 35, 112, and 215
 Non-Tropical Convection: VCP 12, 212, and 215
 Tropical System Convection: VCP 212, 215, 112, and 121

The specific VCP currently in use at each NEXRAD site is available.

Enhancements

Super resolution
Deployed from March to August 2008 with all level II data, the Super Resolution upgrade permitted the capability of the radar to produce much higher resolution data. Initially, the increased resolution is only available in the lower scan elevations. Super resolution makes a compromise of slightly decreased noise reduction for a large gain in resolution.

The improvement in azimuthal resolution increases the range at which tornadic mesoscale rotations can be detected. This allows for faster lead time on warnings and extends the useful range of the radar. The increased resolution (in both azimuth and range) increases the detail of such rotations, giving a more accurate representation of the storm. Along with providing better detail of detected precipitation and other mesoscale features, Super Resolution also provides additional detail to aid in other severe storm analysis. Super Resolution extends the range of velocity data and provides it faster than before, also allowing for faster lead time on potential tornado detection and subsequent warnings.

Dual polarization

WSR-88D sites across the nation have been upgraded to polarimetric radar, which adds a vertical polarization to the traditional horizontally polarized radar waves, in order to more accurately discern what is reflecting the signal. This so-called dual polarization allows the radar to distinguish between rain, hail, and snow, something the horizontally polarized radars cannot accurately do. Early trials showed that rain, ice pellets, snow, hail, birds, insects, and ground clutter all have different signatures with dual polarization, which could mark a significant improvement in forecasting winter storms and severe thunderstorms. The deployment of the dual polarization capability (Build 12) to NEXRAD sites began in 2010 and was completed by the summer of 2013. The radar at Vance Air Force Base in Enid, Oklahoma was the first operational WSR-88D modified to utilize dual polarization technology. The modified radar went into operation on March 3, 2011.

AVSET 
When the NEXRAD system was initially implemented, the radar automatically scanned all scan angles in a Volume Coverage Pattern, even if the highest scan angles were free of precipitation. As a result, in many cases when severe weather was farther from the radar site, forecasters could not provide as timely severe weather warnings as possible. The Automated Volume Scan Evaluation and Termination (AVSET) algorithm helps solve this problem by immediately ending the volume scan when precipitation returns at higher scan angles drop below a set threshold (around 20 dBZ). This can often allow for more volume scans per hour, improving severe weather detection without the need for hardware upgrades AVSET was initially deployed in RPG build 12.3, in Fall of 2011.

SAILS and MESO-SAILS

One of the primary weaknesses of the WSR-88D radar system was the lack of frequency of base (0.5 degree) scans, especially during severe weather. Forecasters, and TV viewers at home, often had access to images that were four or five minutes old, and therefore had inaccurate information. TV viewers at home could be lulled into a false sense of security that a tornado was farther away from them than it really was, endangering residents in the storm's path. The Supplemental Adaptive Intra-Volume Low-Level Scan (SAILS) technique, deployed with Build 14 in the first half of 2014, allows operators the option to run an additional base scan during the middle of a typical volume scan. With one SAILS cut active on VCP 212, base scans occur about once every two and a half minutes, with more frequent updates if AVSET terminates the volume scan early.

Multiple Elevation Scan Option for Supplemental Adaptive Intra-Volume Low-Level Scan (MESO-SAILS) is an enhancement to SAILS, which allows the radar operator to run one, two or three additional base scans during the course of a volume scan, per the operators request. During June 2013, the Radar Operations Center first tested SAILSx2, which adds two additional low-level scans per volume. It was executed for approximately 4.5 hours and during the testing, an Electronics Technician observed the pedestal/antenna assembly's behavior. No excessive wear was noted. Two days later, SAILSx3 was executed, which added 3 additional low-level scans to a volume. During this 1.5 hour test of SAILSx3, a ROC Radar Hardware Engineer accompanied the ROC Electronics Technician to observe the antenna/pedestal assembly. Again, no excessive wear was noted. MESO-SAILS was deployed with Build 16.1, in spring of 2016.

MRLE 
Mid-Volume Rescan of Low-Level Elevations (colloquially known as M.R.L.E.) is a dynamic scanning option for the WSR-88D derived from MESO-SAILS, a separate scanning option implemented in NEXRAD RPG 14.0, in the Spring of 2014.

During quasi-linear convective systems (QLCS), colloquially known as squall lines, the detection of mesovortices, which generate at 4,000 to 8,000 feet above ground level, is not always possible with SAILS cuts, as the base 0.5 degree scan travels below the formation of mesovortices at closer distances to the radar. MRLE consecutively scans either the two, three or four lowest scan angles during the middle of a typical volume scan, allowing more frequent surveillance of mesovortex formation during QLCS events. MRLE will be deployed on a non-operational basis in RPG 18.0 in spring of 2018, with possible operational deployment with RPG 19.0, if proven useful or of importance.

Deployment was anticipated by the Radar Operations Center to commence in October 2017, along with the RPG 18.0 build, on a non-operational basis. The scanning option will only be available for use with Volume Coverage Patterns 21, 12, 212, and additionally 215. If proven to be significant in terms of warning dissemination, MRLE will deploy operationally nationwide with RPG 18.0, planned for 2018.

Concept

The concept of MRLE derives from the need of more frequent low-level scans during quasi-linear convective systems (QLCSs). During QLCSs, it is not uncommon for brief and otherwise un-noticeable mesovortices to spawn at points along the line. Due to untimely radar data and time being taken to complete the entire volume, these vortices often spawn without warning or prior notice. With MRLE, the operator has the choice between 2 and 4 low-level scans. Unlike MESO-SAILS, which scans at one angle and can only do up to 3 low-level scans per volume, MRLE scans at 4 possible angles, and can cut into a volume up to 4 times, depending on the operators choice. The angles are as follows, alongside their respective scan frequencies:

MRLEx2 = 0.5° and 0.9° elevations
MRLEx3 = 0.5°, 0.9° and 1.3° elevations
MRLEx4 = 0.5°, 0.9°, 1.3° and 1.8° elevations
The operator can not use MESO-SAILS alongside MRLE simultaneously. If one is selected while the other is active, the NEXRAD algorithms will automatically set the other "off".

Service Life Extension Program 
Started on March 13, 2013, the SLEP, or Service Life Extension Program, is an extensive effort to keep and maintain the current NEXRAD network in working order for as long as possible. These improvements include Signal Processor upgrades, Pedestal upgrades, Transmitter upgrades, and shelter upgrades. The program is anticipated to be finished by 2022, which coincides with the beginnings of a nationwide implementation of Multi-function Phased Array Radars (see below).

Coverage gaps

WSR-88D has coverage gaps below 10,000 feet (or no coverage at all) in many parts of the continental United States, often for terrain or budgetary reasons, or remoteness of the area. Such notable gaps include most of Alaska; several areas of Oregon, including the central and southern coast and much of the area east of the Cascade Mountains; many portions of the Rocky Mountains; Pierre, South Dakota; portions of northern Texas; large portions of the Nebraska panhandle; the Four Corners region; the area around the Northwest Angle in Minnesota; an area near the Connecticut River in Vermont; and areas near the borders of the Oklahoma and Texas Panhandles. Notably, many of these gaps lie in tornado alley. At least one tornado has gone undetected by WSR-88D as a result of such a coverage gap – an EF1 tornado in Lovelady, Texas in April 2014. As a result of the coverage gap, initial reports of tornadic activity were treated with skepticism by the local National Weather Service forecast office.

Coverage gaps can also be caused during radar outages, especially in areas with little to no overlapping coverage. For example, a hardware failure on July 16, 2013 resulted in an outage and coverage gap for the Albany, New York area that lasted through early August.

A coverage gap in North Carolina encouraged Senator Richard Burr to propose S. 2058, also known as the Metropolitan Weather Hazard Protection Act of 2015. The act mandates that any city with a population of 700,000 or more must have Doppler Radar coverage <6,000 feet above ground level.  The bill passed the Senate, but died in a House committee.

It is not likely that additional WSR-88Ds will be deployed, as the production line was shut down in 1997, and the National Weather Service has an insufficient budget to restart production. In 2011, a known coverage gap was filled when the Langley Hill radar in southwestern Washington was installed, using the last remaining spare.  This radar opportunity was spearheaded by a public campaign led by Professor Cliff Mass at the University of Washington, and likely helped the NWS office in Portland, Oregon issue a timely warning for the Manzanita, OR EF-2 tornado in October, 2016.

In 2021, the National Weather Service office in Slidell, Louisiana announced that they would move the office's NEXRAD from the office building in Slidell west to Hammond at the end of 2022. Along with a lower elevation angle, the new location would enable lower level monitoring of storm activity in the Baton Rouge area, where the lowest sampling elevation would drop from 4000-6000 feet above the surface to 300-600 feet.

Destroyed radars 
The NEXRAD site located in Cayey, Puerto Rico was destroyed during the passage of Hurricane Maria through the region in September 2017. In addition to a neighboring Terminal Doppler Weather Radar (TDWR) site that was rendered temporarily inoperable but ultimately survived, the Department of Defense deployed two short-range X-band radars on the island to provide radar coverage until the FAA-maintained NEXRAD site was restored. In June 2018, this NEXRAD radar site was restored to fully operational condition and was reinforced with several lightning rods and secured with a stronger fiberglass dome that included using more than 3,000 bolts.

NEXRAD radars based in Houston, Shreveport and Fort Polk were used to fill gaps in radar coverage within portions of Southwestern Louisiana until the Lake Charles site was rebuilt; the NWS Radar Operations Center also deployed a SMART-R vehicle on loan from the University of Oklahoma to provide supplemental radar data on Hurricane Delta in advance of its track into the region (nearly paralleling that of Hurricane Laura) in late October. Operational service to the Lake Charles NEXRAD radar site was restored in January 2021, following a four-month, $1.65-million reconstruction project that included the replacement of the radome and internal equipment and repairs to the station's radome pedestal, tower, fence and equipment shelters.

Future enhancements

Current NEXRAD system 
The National Weather Service keeps a list of upcoming improvements to the WSR-88D system.

Multi-function Phased Array Radar (MPAR)

Beyond dual-polarization, the advent of phased array radar will probably be the next major improvement in severe weather detection. Its ability to rapidly scan large areas would give an enormous advantage to radar meteorologists. Its additional ability to track both known and unknown aircraft in three dimensions would allow a phased array network to simultaneously replace the current Air Route Surveillance Radar network, saving the United States government billions of dollars in maintenance costs. The National Severe Storms Laboratory predicts that a phased array system will eventually replace the current network of WSR-88D radar transmitters.

Applications

Usage
NEXRAD data is used in multiple ways. It is used by National Weather Service meteorologists and (under provisions of U.S. law) is freely available to users outside of the NWS, including researchers, media, and private citizens. The primary goal of NEXRAD data is to aid NWS meteorologists in operational forecasting. The data allows them to accurately track precipitation and anticipate its development and track. More importantly, it allows the meteorologists to track and anticipate severe weather and tornadoes. Combined with ground reports, tornado and severe thunderstorm warnings can be issued to alert the public about dangerous storms. NEXRAD data also provides information about rainfall rate and aids in hydrological forecasting. Data is provided to the public in several forms, the most basic form being graphics published to the NWS website. Data is also available in two similar, but different, raw formats. Available directly from the NWS is Level III data, consisting of reduced resolution, low-bandwidth base products as well as many derived, post-processed products; Level II data consists of only the base products, but at their original resolution. Because of the higher bandwidth costs, Level II data is not available directly from the NWS. The NWS distributes this data freely to Amazon Web Services and several top-tier universities, which in turn distribute the data to private organizations.

Operational locations

See also
 Canadian weather radar network
 List of Bureau of Meteorology weather radars
 Low level windshear alert system (LLWAS)
 Terminal Doppler Weather Radar (TDWR)

Notes

References
 Atlas, David, Radar in Meteorology: Battan Memorial and 40th Anniversary Radar Meteorology Conference, published by the American Meteorological Society, Boston, 1990, 806 pages, AMS Code RADMET.

External links

Theory of Doppler Weather Radar
 Frequently Asked Questions by NOAA
 Radar Frequently Asked Questions (FAQ) by Weather Underground
 Social & Economic Benefits of NEXRAD from "NOAA Socioeconomics" website initiative
Real time data
 NEXRAD real time data
 National Radar Reflectivity Mosaic FAQ's  by NOAA
Research
 RADAR Research and Development by NSSL

National Weather Service weather radars